The Norwegian Institute for Social Research (ISF) is a private social science research institute based in Oslo, Norway.

It was founded in 1950 by Vilhelm Aubert, Arne Næss, Eirik Rinde, and Stein Rokkan. It publishes the journal Tidsskrift for samfunnsforskning.

The institute is divided into five research fields, each with its own research director. They are Bernt Aardal (Political institutions, voting and public opinion), Erling Barth (Employment and working conditions), Mari Teigen (Gender and society), Bernard Enjolras (Civil society in transition) and Hilde Lidén (International migration, integration and ethnic relations). In total, the institute has 52 employees.

References
 Official website

Research institutes in Norway
Education in Oslo
Independent research institutes
Social science institutes
Arne Næss